Santaris Pharma A/S was a biopharmaceutical company founded in 2003 in Copenhagen, Denmark. The company also had a branch in San Diego, California that opened in 2009. Created by a merger between Cureon and Pantheco, Santaris developed RNA-targeted medicines using a Locked Nucleic Acid (LNA) Drug Platform and Drug Development Engine.

Santaris had gained the worldwide intellectual property rights to the therapeutic applications of locked nucleic acid (LNA) technology. These rights included ownership of over 60 patent types, which ranged from the chemistry to manufacturing and from therapeutic uses to drug design. With its LNA technology, Santaris developed drugs for a range of diseases using microRNA and mRNA. Its research focused on infectious disease and metabolic disorders. The company also worked on collaborations with pharmaceuticals to develop drugs that could treat cancers and rare genetic disorders, among other things.

In August 2014, Santaris was acquired by Roche for $450 million. As a result, the Copenhagen site was renamed the Roche Innovation Center Copenhagen (RICC). RICC houses Roche's RNA Molecule Research, which is part of Roche Pharma Research and Early Development.

Locked Nucleic Acid (LNA) drug platform 
Santaris developed LNA-based drugs to identify and design drug candidates. LNA is a modification of RNA, containing an oxymethylene bridge between the 2’ oxygen and 4’ carbon in the ribose ring. This bridge forms a bi-cyclic structure that locks the ribose conformation and is integral to the high stability and affinity of the LNA to its complementary RNA sequence. Santaris designed LNA oligonucleotides as antisense therapeutics to complement specific mRNA and microRNA sequences. Binding of the oligonucleotide to the target creates a stretch of dsRNA, which prevents translation. LNA oligonucleotides are shorter than other antisense drugs, which allows them a higher target affinity and potency than regular RNA oligonucleotides. LNA drugs are novel therapeutic agents because of their resistance to endonuclease activity. They do not need complicated drug delivery vehicles, their manufacturing is scalable and cost-effective, they are well tolerated, and there is potential for oral delivery.

Drug candidates

Cancer drug candidates
Santaris Pharma A/S had two novel drug candidates for the treatment of solid tumors and lymphomas, EZN-2968 and EZN-3042. EZN-2968 is an inhibitor of a transcription factor, HIF-1α, that is involved in cells ability to undergo angiogenesis and other processes needed for cell survival. EZN-3042 is also an inhibitor, which acts against Survivin. Santaris partnered with Enzon Pharmaceuticals  for the development of both drug candidates.

Metabolic disorders candidates
SPC-4955 is a novel treatment for cholesterol. SPC-4955 inhibits the protein that is necessary for the formation of plasma LDL cholesterol particles. This has the potential to be used as treatment for patients with hyperlipidemia.
The PCSK9 program also has the potential to treat patients with hyperlipidemia. It inhibits the protein which controls the number of receptors responsible for removing LDL cholesterol particles from the blood.

Infectious disease
Santaris developed a microRNA targeting drug for hepatitis C, miravirsen (SPC3649), which entered Phase II clinical trials in 2010. The drug targets miR-122, a host factor necessary for viral replication of the hepatitis C virus in host liver cells; because miravirsen targets a host factor rather than the virus itself, there are no indications of the virus developing resistance. The U.S. Food and Drug Administration approved a multiple dosing study, by injection, to treatment naive patients for phase II testing.

Rare genetic disorders
Santaris had a collaboration with Shire to discover and develop new RNA-based medicines to treat rare genetic disorders.

Collaborations 
Santaris partnered with several pharmaceuticals companies that wanted to develop LNA oligonucleotides for mRNA and microRNA targets. Pfizer and Santaris entered a collaboration pact in 2009, which was expanded in 2011. It also partnership with Enzon for cancer drug targets,  Shire for lead candidates of five rare, undisclosed genetic disorders, miRagen to develop treatments targeting microRNAs associated with cardiovascular disease, and GlasoSmithKline for four viral disease programs and clinical trials.

Publications 
Santaris employees have co-authored articles published in Nature (2008), and Science (2009).
These have outlined the results of experiments using LNA oligonucleotides to down-regulate the expression of endogenous microRNAs in primates.

Timeline 
 2003: Santaris founded through a merger of Cureon and Pantheco.
 2004: Began cancer drug development – LNA-based drugs SPC3042 targeting Survivin and SPC2968 targeting HIF-1alpha.
 2005: Began a miRNA research and drug development program.
 2006: Partnership with Enzon for cancer therapeutics.
 2007: Commencement of preclinical development of SPC3649, a microRNA-targeted drug for the treatment of Hepatitis C. Established commercial partnership with GlaxoSmithKline for global research and development and of up four programs in viral diseases. Enzon files IND and completes two Phase I/II US studies of advanced cancer research with EZN-2968.
 2008: Biotech grant from Danish Advanced Technology for microRNA antagonist research for 45m DKK. Santaris Pharma named one of the “Fierce 15” Biotech Companies of 2008 by FierceBiotech. Advanced to Phase 1 clinical trials for the treatment of HCV using a microRNA-targeted drug, SPC3649. Study published in Nature that shows LNA-based drugs targeting microRNAs capacity in non-human primates. 
 2009: Establishment of branch in San Diego, California, United States of America. Formed collaboration with Shire to develop RNA-based medicines for the treatment of rare genetic disorders. Advanced the 4955 into drug development, which is a compound that targets Apolipoprotein B and could decrease and manage high cholesterol into drug development. Publication in Science showing how the breakthrough microRNA-targeted therapy SPC3649 is a promising new treatment for Hepatitis C. Wyeth Pharmaceuticals and Santaris Pharma announce their partnership to develop RNA-targeted medicines.
 2010: Santaris Pharma A/S and miRagen Therapeutics form an alliance to develop microRNA-targeted medicines for treatment of cardiovascular disease. Advanced SPC5001, which targets PCSK9, into drug development for the treatment of high cholesterol. Received the Red Herring Top 100 Europe Award.
 2011: Obtained license from Mass General Hospital for intellectual property related to miR-33 regulations for cardiovascular disorder treatment. Expanded collaborations with Pfizer Inc. directed on development of RNA-targeted medicines. Santaris made medical history with their advancement of miravirsen to Phase II trials, which is the first microRNA-targeted drug to enter clinical trials, and aims to treat patients infected with Hepatitis C.
 2013: Santaris Pharma A/S and Bristol-Myers Squibb form an alliance to develop lead candidates against a limited number of targets
 2013: Santaris Pharma A/S and RaNa form an alliance to develop lead candidates against <10 of RaNA’s proprietary RNA targets for the treatment of human   diseases
 2014: Santaris Pharma A/S was acquired by Roche and renamed the Roche Innovation Center Copenhagen.

Awards 
2008: Fierce 15 by Fierce Biotechnology 
2010: Red Herring Top 100 Europe Award  
2011: Finalist for 2011 Scrip Awards in the "Clinical Research Team of the Year" category.

Corporate structure

Executives 
J. Donald deBethizy – President & Chief Executive Officer
Henrik Stage, MS. – Chief Financial Officer & EVP Corporate Development
Henrik Ørum, MSc PhD – VP & Chief Scientific Officer
Michael R. Hodges, MD – VP & Chief Medical Officer
Troels Koch, PhD – VP & Chief Technology Officer
Bo Rode Hansen, PhD – VP, Alliance Management & Partnered Drug Discovery

Litigation 
Santaris Pharma A/S vs. Exiqon A/S
Exiqon brought Santaris to court to obtain more rights of LNA technology in 2010. On Friday, October 7, 2011, all the allegations initiated by Exiqon against Santaris were dismissed by the arbitration court. The ruling confirmed that Santaris held exclusive worldwide rights to manufacture, have manufactured, and sell products that comprise LNA as active ingredient for studies performed with a purpose of developing LNA-based drugs for marketing approval.
Santaris Pharama A/S vs. Isis Pharmaceuticals
Isis Pharmaceuticals filed a patent infringement lawsuit against Santaris Pharma A/S in the United States District Court of the Southern District of California in September 2011. Isis's infringement suit against Santaris is based upon Santaris's activities providing antisense drugs and antisense drug discovery services to several pharmaceutical companies.

References 

Pharmaceutical companies of Denmark
Pharmaceutical companies established in 2003